

National flag

President flags

Military flags

Municipal flags

Organization flags

Political flags

Provincial flags

Canton flags

Historical flags

Burgees

See also 

 Flag of Ecuador
 Coat of arms of Ecuador

References 

Lists and galleries of flags
Flags